This article serves as an index – as complete as possible – of all the honorific orders or similar decorations awarded by Malaysia, classified by Monarchies chapter and Republics chapter, and, under each chapter, recipients' countries and the detailed list of recipients.

Awards

Monarchies 

 States of Malaysia

Johor Royal Family 

They have been awarded :

 Sultan Ibrahim Ismail of Johor :
  Recipient of the Order of the Crown of the Realm (DMN, 2 March 2015)
  Knight Grand Commander of the Order of the Defender of the Realm (SMN, 3 June 1987) with title Tun

Kedah Royal Family 
They have been awarded :

 Sultanah Haminah of Kedah, 2nd wife of the late Sultan Abdul Halim of Kedah :
  Recipient of the Order of the Crown of the Realm (DMN, 2012)
 Tunku Intan Safinaz, Sultan Abdul Halim of Kedah and Tuanku Bahiyah's daughter 
  Commander of the Order of Loyalty to the Crown of Malaysia (PSM) with title Tan Sri 
  Commander of the Order of Military Service of Malaysia (PAT)
 Tunku Soraya, Sultan Abdul Halim of Kedah and Tuanku Bahiyah's adoptive daughter 
  Commander of the Order of Loyalty to the Crown of Malaysia (PSM) with title Tan Sri
 Sultan Sallehuddin of Kedah (3rd younger brother of the late Sultan and member of the Regency Council 2011)
  Recipient of the Order of the Crown of the Realm (DMN)
  Commander of the Order of Loyalty to the Crown of Malaysia (PSM) with title Tan Sri
  Commander of the Order of Military Service of Malaysia (PAT) 
  Mentioned in dispatches (KPK)

Kelantan Royal Family 
They have been awarded:

 Sultan Muhammad V of Kelantan, Sultan of Kelantan (since 13 September 2010) and as Yang di-Pertuan Agong, (13 December 2016 – 6 January 2019) : 
  Recipient of Order of the Royal House of Malaysia (DKM, 31.1.2017)
  Recipient of the Order of the Crown of the Realm (DMN, 7.12.2011)
  Grand Master (2016-2019) of the Order of the Defender of the Realm
  Grand Master (2016-2019) of the Order of Loyalty to the Crown of Malaysia
  Grand Master (2016-2019) of the Order of Merit of Malaysia
  Grand Master (2016-2019) of the Order of the Royal Household of Malaysia
 Sultan Ismail Petra of Kelantan, Sultan Muhammad V of Kelantan's father and retired Sultan for illness :
  Recipient of the Order of the Crown of the Realm (DMN)
 Tengku Mohamad Rizam, Tengku Temenggong, cousin of Sultan Muhammad V of Kelantan.
  Commander of the Order of Loyalty to the Crown of Malaysia (PSM, 2017) with title Tan Sri
 Tengku Mohamad Ridzman, cousin of Sultan Muhammad V of Kelantan
  Knight of the Order of the Royal Household of Malaysia (PSD, 2017) with title Datuk
 Tengku Razaleigh, granduncle of Sultan Muhammad V of Kelantan
  Commander of the Order of Loyalty to the Crown of Malaysia (PSM, 1973) with title Tan Sri
 Tengku Mahaleel, second cousin of Sultan Muhammad V of Kelantan
  Commander of the Order of Loyalty to the Crown of Malaysia (PSM, 2000) with title Tan Sri
  Knight of the Order of the Royal Household of Malaysia (PSD, 1998) with title Datuk

Negeri Sembilan Royal Family 
They have been awarded :

 Tuanku Muhriz of Negeri Sembilan :
  Recipient of the Order of the Crown of the Realm (DMN)
 Tuanku Najihah, widow of late  Yang di-Pertuan Besar Jaafar of Negeri Sembilan, as Raja Permaisuri Agong of Malaysia (26 April 1994 to 25 April 1999), she has been awarded : 
  Recipient of the Order of the Crown of the Realm (DMN) 
 Tunku Naquiah, Tunku Dara, elder daughter and child of late  Yang di-Pertuan Besar Jaafar of Negeri Sembilan :
  Member of the Order of the Defender of the Realm (AMN)
  Commander of the Order of Loyalty to the Crown of Malaysia (PSM) with title Tan Sri
 Tunku Imran, Tunku Muda of Serting, second son and third child of late  Yang di-Pertuan Besar Jaafar of Negeri Sembilan : 
  Commander of the Order of the Defender of the Realm (PMN, 1992) with title Tan Sri
 earlier  Member of the Order of the Defender of the Realm (AMN)
  Commander of the Order of Loyalty to the Crown of Malaysia (PSM) with title Tan Sri

Pahang Royal Family 
They have been awarded :

 Al-Sultan Abdullah, Sultan of Pahang (since 15 January 2019) and as Yang di-Pertuan Agong, (31 January 2019 – 30 January 2024) : 
  Recipient of Order of the Royal House of Malaysia (DKM, 11.7.2019)
  Recipient of the Order of the Crown of the Realm (DMN, 14.2.2019)
  Grand Master (2019-2024) of the Order of the Defender of the Realm
  Grand Master (2019-2024) of the Order of Loyalty to the Crown of Malaysia
  Grand Master (2019-2024) of the Order of Merit of Malaysia
  Grand Master (2019-2024) of the Order of the Royal Household of Malaysia
 Tengku Meriam, eldest sister of the sultan :
  Commander of the Order of Loyalty to the Crown of Malaysia (PSM, 1984) with title Tan Sri
 Tengku Ibrahim, Tengku Arif Bendahara, uncle of the sultan.
  Commander of the Order of Loyalty to the Crown of Malaysia (PSM, 1983) with title Tan Sri
 Tengku Abdullah, Tengku Arif Bendahara, uncle of the sultan.
  Commander of the Order of Loyalty to the Crown of Malaysia (PSM, 2015) with title Tan Sri
  Commander of the Order of Military Service (PAT)

Perak Royal Family 
They have been awarded :

 Tuanku Bainun : 
  Recipient of the Order of the Crown of the Realm (DMN) 
 Sultan Nazrin Shah of Perak 
  Recipient of the Order of the Crown of the Realm (DMN)

Perlis Royal Family 

 Tuanku Sirajuddin of Perlis (as Yang di-Pertuan Agong of Malaysia 13.12.2001 – 12.12.2006) :
  Recipient of the Order of the Royal House of Malaysia (DKM, 13.12.2001)
  Order of the Crown of the Realm : Recipient (DMN, 17.4.2000) and Grand Master (2001–2006)
  Grand Master of the Order of the Defender of the Realm (2001–2006)
   Grand Master of the Order of Loyalty to the Crown of Malaysia (2001–2006)
  Grand Master of the Order of Merit of Malaysia (2001–2006)
  Grand Master of the Order for Important Services (Malaysia) (2001–2006)
  Grand Master of the Order of the Royal Household of Malaysia (2001–2006)
 Tuanku Fauziah (Tuanku Sirajuddin of Perlis's wife) :
  Recipient of the Order of the Crown of the Realm (DMN, 13.12.2001)

Selangor Royal Family 
They have been awarded :

 Sharafuddin of Selangor :
  Recipient of the Order of the Crown of the Realm (DMN, 8.3.2003)
 Tengku Ahmad Shah, third younger brother of Sultan Sharafuddin
  Knight of the Order of the Royal Household of Malaysia (PSD, 3.6.2000)
 Tengku Zahariah, third sister of Sultan Sharafuddin
  Knight of the Order of the Royal Household of Malaysia (PSD, 3.6.2000)

Terengganu Royal Family 
They have been awarded:

 Sultan Mizan Zainal Abidin of Terengganu (as Yang di-Pertuan Agong from 13 December 2006 until 12 December 2011) :
  Grand Master (2006-2011) and Recipient (DKM, 5.4.2007) of the Order of the Royal House of Malaysia 
   Recipient (DMN, 27 February 1999) and Grand Master (2006-2011) of the Order of the Crown of the Realm
  Grand Commander (SMN, 27.2.1999) and Grand Master (2006-2011) of the Order of the Defender of the Realm with title Tun
  Grand Master of the Order of Loyalty to the Crown of Malaysia (2006-2011) 
   Grand Master of the Order of Merit of Malaysia (2006-2011) 
  Grand Master of the Order for Important Services (Malaysia) (2006-2011) 
  Grand Master of the Order of the Royal Household of Malaysia (2006-2011)
Sultanah Nur Zahirah :
  Order of the Crown of the Realm  (DMN, 5.4.2007, as Consort of the Yang di-Pertuan Agong)
Y.A.M. Dato’ Hajjah Tengku Amira Zahara Farah Qurashiyah , Tengku Kamala Putri (Sultan Mizan Zainal Abidin's elder sister) : According to Royal Ark : DMN (27.2.1999) but it is strange as she is not a ruler's wife, so maybe PMN ...
 either  Recipient of the Order of the Crown of the Realm (DMN, 27.2.1999)  
 or  Commander of the Order of the Defender of the Realm (PMN, 27.2.1999) with title Tan Sri

Governors of Malacca 

 Mohd Khalil Yaakob ( 6th Yang di-Pertua Negeri of Malacca since 4 June 2004 ) :
  Grand Commander of the Order of the Defender of the Realm  (SMN) with title Tun
 Order of Loyalty to the Crown of Malaysia : first  Companion (JSM), later  Commander (PSM) with title Tan Sri

Governors of Penang 

 Abdul Rahman Abbas (7th Governor of Penang :  - present) :
  Grand Commander of the Order of the Defender of the Realm (SMN) with title Tun

Governors of Sabah 

 Juhar Mahiruddin (10th Governor of Sabah  - present) :
   first Companion (JMN), later Grand Commander Order of the Defender of the Realm (SMN) with title Tun
  Recipient of the Order for Important Services (Malaysia) (PJN)

Governors of Sarawak 

 Abang Muhammad Salahuddin ( 3rd & 6th List of Yang di-Pertua Negeri of Sarawak 2 April 1977 – 2 April 1981 & since 22 February 2001 ) :
  Grand Commander of the Order of the Defender of the Realm  (SMN) with title Tun

 Asian monarchies

Brunei Royal Family 

 Hassanal Bolkiah : 
  Recipient of the Order of the Crown of the Realm (DMN, 9.7.1980)  
 Gallant Commander of the Order of Warriors of the Military Forces (PGAT, 29.10.1986) 
 Mariam, his second wife : Malaysia Service Medal (PMJ, 11.4.1987)
 Abdul Malik, his third son : Installation Medal (11 April 2012).

 - See also : List of Honours of Johor awarded to Heads of State and Royals 
 Hassanal Bolkiah :  First Class of the Royal Family Order of Johor (DK I, 1980)
 Mariam, his second wife : 
  First Class of the Royal Family Order of Johor (DK I, 6.3.1997)
  Knight Grand Commander of the Order of the Crown of Johor (SPMJ, 11.4.1987)
 Mohamed Bolkiah, sultan's brother :  Knight Grand Commander of the Order of the Crown of Johor (SPMJ)

 - See also : List of Honours of Kelantan awarded to Heads of State and Royals 
 Hassanal Bolkiah :  Recipient of the Royal Family Order or Star of Yunus (DK, 3.8.1968)
 Queen Saleha, his first wife :  Recipient of the Royal Family Order or Star of Yunus (DK, 7.3.1999)
 Mariam, his second wife :  Recipient of the Royal Family Order or Star of Yunus (DK, 7.3.1999)

 - See also : List of Honours of Negeri Sembilan awarded to Heads of State and Royals
 Hassanal Bolkiah :  Member of the Royal Family Order of Negeri Sembilan (DKNS, 6.8.1980)

 - See also : List of Honours of Pahang awarded to Heads of State and Royals
 Hassanal Bolkiah :  Member 1st class of the Family Order of the Crown of Indra of Pahang (DK I, 19.5.1984)
 Mohamed Bolkiah, sultan's brother :  Grand Knight of the Order of Sultan Ahmad Shah of Pahang (SSAP)

 - See also : List of Honours of Perak awarded to Heads of State and Royals 
 Hassanal Bolkiah :  Recipient of the Royal Family Order of Perak (DK, 7.8.1988) -- currently : 
 Mohamed Bolkiah, sultan's brother :  Grand Knight (Dato' Seri) of the Order of Cura Si Manja Kini (the Perak Sword of State, SPCM) with title Dato' Sri

 - See also : List of Honours of Perlis awarded to Heads of State and Royals
 Hassanal Bolkiah :  Recipient of the Perlis Family Order of the Gallant Prince Syed Putra Jamalullail (DK, 12.3.1988)

 - See also : List of Honours of Selangor awarded to Heads of State and Royals 
 Hassanal Bolkiah :  First Class of the Royal Family Order of Selangor (DK I, 23.11.1987)
 Mohamed Bolkiah, sultan's brother :  Companion of the Order of Sultan Salah ud-din 'Abdu'l Aziz Shah (SSA)

 - See also : List of Honours of Terengganu awarded to Heads of State and Royals 
 Hassanal Bolkiah :  Member first class of the Family Order of Terengganu (DK I, 4.10.1992)

 - See also : List of Honours of Sarawak awarded to Heads of State and Royals 
 Hassanal Bolkiah : DUBS of Sarawak (9.3.1989)
 Mariam, his second wife :  DA of Sarawak.

Japanese Imperial Family 
 Emperor Akihito :  Recipient of the Order of the Crown of the Realm (DMN)
 Empress Michiko :  Recipient of the Order of the Crown of the Realm (DMN)

Thai Royal Family 
 Queen Sirikit of Thailand :   Recipient of the Order of the Crown of the Realm (Darjah Utama Seri Mahkota Negara - DMN), 1963 
 Princess Sirindhorn of Thailand :  Grand Commander of The Most Esteemed Order of Loyalty to the Crown of Malaysia (SSM, 2009) with title Tun

 - See also : List of Honours of Kelantan awarded to Heads of State and Royals
 Queen Sirikit of Thailand :  Recipient of the Royal Family Order or Star of Yunus (Darjah Kerabat Yang Amat Di Hormati, DK, 2004)

 - See also : List of Honours of Selangor awarded to Heads of State and Royals
 Queen Sirikit of Thailand :  First Class of the Royal Family Order of Selangor (DK I, Darjah Kerabat Yang Amat Dihormati Kelas Pertama, 1999)

 - See also : List of Honours of Terengganu awarded to Heads of State and Royals
 Queen Sirikit of Thailand :  Member of the Most Distinguished Royal Family Order of Terengganu (Darjah Kerabat di-Raja Terengganu Yang Amat Mulia, DKR, 2009) 
 King Vajiralongkorn of Thailand :  Member second class of the Family Order of Terengganu (DK II)

to be completed

 European monarchies

British Royal Family 
 HM The Queen :  Recipient of the Order of the Crown of the Realm (Darjah Utama Seri Mahkota Negara, DMN, 1972)

Swedish Royal Family 
 Carl XVI Gustaf of Sweden :  Recipient of the Order of the Crown of the Realm (DMN, 2005) 
 Queen Silvia of Sweden :  Recipient of the Order of the Crown of the Realm (DMN, 2005) 
 Victoria, Crown Princess of Sweden :  Grand Commander of the Order of the Defender of the Realm (SMN, 2005) with title Tun 
 Prince Carl Philip, Duke of Värmland :  Commander of the Order of Loyalty to the Crown of Malaysia (PSM, 2005) with title Tan Sri 
 Princess Madeleine, Duchess of Hälsingland and Gästrikland :  Commander of the Order of Loyalty to the Crown of Malaysia (PSM, 2005) with title Tan Sri

to be completed

Republics 

to be completed

See also 
 :Category:Lists of honours of a Malaysian Royal Family by country

References 

 01
Malaysia
Malaysian honours list
Orders, decorations, and medals of Malaysia